The Type 206 is a class of diesel-electric submarines (U-boats) developed by Howaldtswerke-Deutsche Werft (HDW). Its design is based on the preceding Type 205 submarine class. These small and agile submarines were built during the Cold War to operate in the shallow Baltic Sea and attack Warsaw Pact shipping in the event of military confrontation. The pressure hulls were built out of non-magnetic steel to counter the threat of magnetic naval mines and make detection with MAD sensors more difficult. The low emission profile allowed the submarines in exercises to intrude even into well-protected opposing forces such as carrier formations with their screen.

Programme

Ten Type 205 submarines were constructed between 1962 and 1968 with hulls constructed of a new non-magnetic steel. The early boats, however, suffered from cracking due to stress corrosion and an urgent programme was initiated to develop a new steel which overcame these problems, which received much publicity at the time. The new high-strength, non-magnetic, austenitic steel has greater elasticity and good dynamic strength, and has proved very satisfactory in service, thoroughly overcoming the doubts that were raised by those early problems, although it has never been selected by IKL's many export customers and thus remains unique to German Navy submarines. Subsequently, the Type 206 was designed by Ingenieur Kontor Lübeck (IKL)  in 1964–65 and a production order was placed on 7 June 1969 for eight from HDW in Kiel and ten from Nordseewerke in Emden.

Of the 18 submarines built for the Bundesmarine (West German Navy), 12 were modernized in the early 1990s and were re-designated as Type 206A; the others have been decommissioned. The current German Navy is starting to decommission some 206A vessels, with more of the new Type 212 submarines being commissioned. In June 2010 the Ministry of Defence announced that all six remaining vessels were to be retired from active service immediately and to be decommissioned by the end of 2010 to cut costs. There are no type 206 submarines left in active service with the German Navy.

A slightly modified variant of the Type 206 (which includes the distinctive dome, or bulge, in the front of the boat), the Gal-class submarine for the Israeli Navy was built to Israeli specifications as the Vickers Type 540 in the UK rather than Germany for political reasons.  Three such boats were built, the first being commissioned in 1976. When the Israeli navy received its new Dolphin-class submarines (also built by HDW), the Gals were retired. As of 2006, one had been scrapped and two had been sent to HDW in an attempt to find a buyer for them. When no buyer was found, one of the submarines was returned to Israel for display in the Clandestine Immigration and Naval Museum.

Modernisation
A major mid-life modernisation was conducted on twelve of these submarines, the boats concerned now being officially designated Type 206A. The work started in mid-1987 and completed in February 1992, being carried out by Nordseewerke, Emden; this upgrade includes:

The STN Atlas DBQS-21D sonar has been fitted, together with new periscopes, and a new weapon control system (LEWA). The ESM system has been replaced and GPS navigation installed. The rebuilt submarines are armed with new torpedoes (Seeaal), and the propulsion system has been comprehensively refurbished, and improvements have been made to the accommodation.

List of units

Notes:
 After its decommissioning, U21 had an ever-changing history: First it should have been sold to Indonesia as Cundamani. These plans were abandoned and U21 would have been scrapped in Itzehoe, had HDW not taken it on for a planned company museum in Kiel. This museum did not materialise, and U21 was gifted to the city of Eckernförde and towed there. For a short time it operated as a tourist attraction/technology museum, but because of local politics it was sold for scrap and broken up. 
 U13, U14, U19 and U20 were also to be sold to Indonesia. Their names would have been Nagarangsang, Nagabanda, Bramastra and Alugoro.
 February/March 2010 the U26, U28 and U30 were towed by Polish tug Ikar to 's-Gravendeel, Netherlands to be scrapped. 
 U17 and U26 visited New York City for Fleet Week in 1992.

Exports
The Indonesian Navy intended to acquire five Type 206 submarines in 1997 to supplement its submarine fleet, then consisted of two  (Type 209/1300) submarines. On 25 September 1997, Indonesian Navy has taken over two Type 206 submarines and planned to refit them, to be followed by three other submarines. Then in June 1998 Indonesia was running out of funds and the procurement program was cancelled. The vessels were already assigned with names and pennant numbers by the Indonesian Navy by the time it was cancelled.

The Colombian Navy purchased four decommissioned Type 206A submarines to boost its submarine force. Two submarines, named Intrépido  (ex-U23) and Indomable (ex-U24) were commissioned into the Colombian Navy on 28 August 2012. Two submarines (ex-U16 and ex-U18) were acquired to be cannibalized for spare parts. On 5 December 2015, Intrépido and Indomable entered active service after a lengthy refit in Germany.

Gallery

References

Bibliography

External links 

 
 Jane's Major Warships 2003